Besik or Bessik is a Georgian male given name that may refer to
Besik Amashukeli (born 1972), Georgian football player
Besik Aslanasvili (born 1976), Greek freestyle wrestler
Besik Beradze (born 1968), Georgian football player
Bessik Khamashuridze (born 1977), Georgian rugby union coach and former player
Besik Kudukhov (1986–2013), Russian freestyle wrestler
Besik Lezhava (born 1986), Georgian basketball player 
Besik Shengelia (born 1967), Georgian naval officer

See also
Beşik, Bayramiç
Beşik Bay, Çanakkale